The 1923 Idaho Vandals football team represented the University of Idaho in the 1923 college football season, and were led by second-year head coach Robert L. Mathews.

Home games were played on campus in Moscow at MacLean Field, with one in Boise at Public School Field.

Idaho opened the season with two convincing non-conference victories, then shut out neighbor Washington State 14–0 in the Battle of the Palouse across the border at Rogers Field in Pullman, breaking an eight-game losing streak in the series. It was the first of three consecutive wins over the Cougars in the rivalry. The Vandals did not break the winless streak against Oregon, but battled to a scoreless tie at Hayward Field in Eugene. Idaho remained undefeated after six games, all shutouts, but lost the final two on the road in California.

Schedule

 The Little Brown Stein trophy for the Montana game debuted fifteen years later in 1938
 Two games were played on Friday (Montana in Moscow and Washington State in Pullman)

References

External links
Gem of the Mountains: 1924 University of Idaho yearbook – 1923 football season 
Go Mighty Vandals – 1923 football season
Official game program: Idaho at Washington State –  October 19, 1923
Idaho Argonaut – student newspaper – 1923 editions

Idaho
Idaho Vandals football seasons
Idaho Vandals football